Matt Beukeboom (born April 3, 1997), is a Canadian rugby union player. His usual positions are in the second or back row. He currently plays for US Montauban in the French second division.

Career

Beukeboom spent the 2015-2016 season with Queen's University in Kingston, Canada.

In July 2016, he joined the Section Pau Espoirs.

Club
Matt Beukeboom signed up for two seasons with US Montauban in May 2019.

In June 2021, Beukeboom signed on to join Union Sportive Bressane for the upcoming Pro D2 season.

Club statistics

References

External links

1997 births
Living people
Canada international rugby union players
Canadian expatriate rugby union players
Union Sportive Bressane players
Rugby union locks
Rugby union flankers